1999 Ireland rugby union tour of Australia. The Ireland national rugby union team embarked on their third tour of Australia having also visited in 1979 and 1994. The tour saw Brian O'Driscoll make his full international in the first test against Australia. In 2001, O'Driscoll, together with Jeremy Davidson and Malcolm O'Kelly would return to Australia with the British and Irish Lions.

Non-International Games
Scores and results list Ireland's points tally first.

Test matches

Touring party
 Manager: Donal Lenihan
 Assistant manager: Phil Danaher
 Coach: Warren Gatland
 Captain: Dion O'Cuinnegain

Backs

Forwards

References

Ireland national rugby union team tours of Australia
Aus
tour